"God Knows" is the fifth single released by Swedish band Mando Diao and their second release from their second album, Hurricane Bar. The B-sides on the three versions of the single in the UK are all recorded live at the Paradise Rock Club in Boston. These live tracks have all previously appeared on the US Paralyzed EP, with "Little Boy Jr" also appearing on the Japan Tour EP and the limited edition of Bring 'Em In. "The Malevolence also appeared on the UK version of You Can't Steal My Love. The song appeared on the playlist for the FIFA 06 soundtrack.

The song was written by singer/guitarist Gustaf Norén to co-singer/guitarist, Björn Dixgård. The song is about the pressure, as a celebrity, to behave under the spotlight, having all your mistakes magnified and causing problems. "As long as you’re a band," Norén says of this song, "then you can count on each other. You will always get through every problem."

Track listings
 European CD
 "God Knows"
 "We're Hit"
 "The Malevolence"
 "Sweet Jesus"
 Japanese CD
 "God Knows"
 "Down In The Past"
 "We're Hit"
 "The Malevolence"
 "Sweet Jesus"
 UK CD
 "God Knows"
 "Little Boy Jr (Live)"
 7" blue vinyl
 "God Knows"
 "Sheepdog (Live)"
 7" yellow vinyl
 "God Knows (Demo)"
 "Paralyzed (Live)"

All songs by Björn Dixgård and Gustaf Norén.

2004 singles
Mando Diao songs
Songs written by Björn Dixgård
Songs written by Gustaf Norén
2004 songs
EMI Records singles